Club Cool (formerly Ice Station Cool) is an attraction and gift shop located in the former Innoventions East building within Epcot at the Walt Disney World Resort in Lake Buena Vista, Florida. It features complimentary samples of Coca-Cola soft drinks from around the world, similar to the World of Coca-Cola's tasting area in Atlanta, Georgia, although the latter offers a larger selection of products to taste (including both foreign and American beverages). Club Cool also offers Coca-Cola merchandise for purchase. The attraction reopened on September 15, 2021, along with the Creations Shop in the building that formerly housed Innoventions East and Mouse Gear, which was became part of World Celebration.

History

Opened as Ice Station Cool in June 1998, the attraction was themed to a polar exploration, decorated with the pictured vehicle and cavemen frozen in ice.  It closed on June 6, 2005, and re-opened as Club Cool on November 14, 2005. Club Cool gave guests samples of different Coca-Cola drinks from several countries for almost 14 years until it was closed on September 8, 2019, for Epcot's renovation. It reopened on September 15, 2021, in a new location next to the Creations Shop (formerly MouseGear) in the former Innoventions East building.

Drinks offered

The tasting area had self-serve soda dispensers, dispensing Coca-Cola products from several countries. The only drink that contained caffeine was Inca Kola.

After its relocation and reopening on September 15, 2021, Club Cool offers eight flavors:

  Beverly - A very bitter non-alcoholic apéritif, Beverly is the only beverage to have been maintained in all rotations.
  Bon Bon Anglais - A tropical fruit drink
  Country Club Merengue - A smooth, creamy tropical fruit drink
  Minute Maid Joy Apple Lychee - A juice with apple and lychee
  Royal Wattamelon - Sour watermelon flavored soda
  Smart Sour Plum - A tart, plum flavored soda
  Sprite Cucumber - Cucumber-hinted variation of Sprite lemon soda
  Viva Raspberry - Raspberry flavored soda

Former flavors offered

Removed October 29, 2013
  Smart Watermelon
  Kinley Lemon
  Fanta Kolita
  Lift Apple
  Mezzo Mix
  Krest Ginger Ale

Removed September 8, 2019
  Guarana Kuat - Guarana berry flavored
  Inca Kola - Lemon Verbena flavored, comparable to bubblegum
  Sparletta - Raspberry cream soda
  VegitaBeta - A non-carbonated apricot and passion fruit flavored drink, VegitaBeta is the only beverage apart from Beverly to have been offered during the entire 2005–2019 original run of Club Cool.
  Bibo - Kiwi mango
  Fanta Melon Frosty - Melon 
  Fanta Pineapple - Pineapple

See also
World of Coca-Cola
List of Walt Disney World Resort attractions

References

External links
 Official site

Amusement park attractions introduced in 2005
Amusement park attractions that closed in 2019
Amusement park attractions introduced in 2021
Epcot
Coca-Cola buildings and structures
Walt Disney Parks and Resorts attractions
Future World (Epcot)
World Celebration
2005 establishments in Florida
2019 disestablishments in Florida